Newcastle-upon-Tyne was a parliamentary borough in the county of Northumberland of the House of Commons of England from 1283 to 1706, then of the House of Commons of Great Britain from 1707 to 1800 and of the House of Commons of the United Kingdom from 1801 to 1918. It returned two Members of Parliament (MPs), elected by the bloc vote system.

Newcastle first sent Members to Parliament in 1283, although it was not always possible to act upon the writ of summons, which was disregarded on at least four occasions (1315, 1327, 1332 and 1337) because of warfare with the Scots.

The constituency was abolished in 1918, being split into four divisions; Newcastle-upon-Tyne Central, Newcastle-upon-Tyne East, Newcastle-upon-Tyne North and Newcastle-upon-Tyne West.

Boundaries
The constituency was based upon the town, later city, of Newcastle upon Tyne in the historic county of Northumberland in North East England. In 1848, the constituency boundaries were described in A Topographical Dictionary of England.

The borough first exercised the elective franchise in the 23rd of Edward the First, since which time it has returned two members to parliament: the present electoral limits are co-extensive with those of the county of the town, comprising 5730 acres; the old boundaries, which were abrogated in 1832, included 2700 acres only.

When the House of Commons debated the boundaries to be used from 1832, the Tory Party suggested including Gateshead (to the south) and South Shields (to the east) within the Newcastle-upon-Tyne constituency. The Whigs resisted this idea, so these two neighbouring settlements were not incorporated into this seat.

The contents of the parliamentary borough, as defined by the Parliamentary Boundaries Act 1832 (2 and 3 Wm. 4, c. 64) were:The Town and County of the Town of Newcastle and the several Townships of Byker, Heaton, Jesmond, Westgate, and Elswick.The boundaries remained unchanged from 1832 until the area was divided into single member constituencies in 1918. These were not necessarily identical to the boundaries used for local government purposes.

In the period after 1885, the constituency was surrounded by Wansbeck to the west and north, Tyneside to the north east and east, Jarrow to the south east, Gateshead to the south, and Chester-le-Street to the south west.

Members of Parliament
Party affiliations are derived from Stook Smith and Craig (see reference section below). Tory is used prior to the 1835 general election and Conservative from that time. Liberal candidates (as listed by Craig) before the formal creation of the party, shortly after the 1859 general election, are listed as Whig or Radical if the information is available in the work by Stooks Smith.

MPs, who were known by the same name, are distinguished in the table below and the election results by a number in brackets after the name. It is not suggested that such numbers were used by contemporaries of the individuals so numbered.

MPs 1386–1660

MPs 1660–1918

Elections

The bloc vote electoral system was used in elections to fill two seats and first past the post for single member by-elections. Each voter had up to as many votes as there were seats to be filled. Votes had to be cast by a spoken declaration, in public, at the hustings (until the secret ballot was introduced in 1872).

Note on percentage change calculations: Where there was only one candidate of a party in successive elections, for the same number of seats, change is calculated on the party percentage vote. Where there was more than one candidate, in one or both successive elections for the same number of seats, then change is calculated on the individual percentage vote (if applicable).

The reference to some candidates as Non Partisan does not, necessarily, mean that they did not have a party allegiance. It means that the sources consulted did not specify a party allegiance.

Before the Representation of the People Act 1832, the borough had an electorate limited to its freemen. There were about 2,500 voters in the second half of the 18th century.

Elections of the 1710s

Elections of the 1720s

 Death of Blackett, in 1728
 On petition Carr vice Blackett

Elections of the 1730s

Elections of the 1740s

Elections of the 1750s

Elections of the 1760s

Elections of the 1770s

 Death of Blackett

Elections of the 1780s

Elections of the 1790s

 Resignation of Brandling in December 1797

Elections of the 1800s

Elections of the 1810s

 Ridley succeeded as the 3rd Baronet, upon the death of his father (and predecessor as MP) in 1813

Elections of the 1820s

Elections of the 1830s

Ridley's death caused a by-election.

Elections in the 1840s

Elections in the 1850s

 

Blackett resigned due to ill health, causing a by-election.

 
 

 
 
 

Headlam was appointed Judge-Advocate General of the Armed Forces, requiring a by-election.

Elections in the 1860s
Ridley resigned after being appointed a Copyhold, Inclosure and Tithe Commissioner.

Elections in the 1870s
Cowen's death caused a by-election, at which his son was elected.

Elections in the 1880s 

 

Dilke's resignation caused a by-election.

 Cowen lost the support of the local Liberal Association during the campaign period, and Liberal supporters were urged to only vote for Morley.

Morley was appointed Chief Secretary to the Lord Lieutenant of Ireland, requiring a by-election.

Elections in the 1890s 

Morley is appointed Chief Secretary to the Lord Lieutenant of Ireland, requiring a by-election.

Elections in the 1900s

Elections in the 1910s

General Election 1914–15:

Another General Election was required to take place before the end of 1915. The political parties had been making preparations for an election to take place and by the July 1914, the following candidates had been selected; 
Liberal: Edward Shortt 
Labour: Walter Hudson
Unionist: Walter Richard Plummer, Nicholas Grattan-Doyle

See also

 History of parliamentary constituencies and boundaries in Northumberland

Notes

References
 Boundaries of Parliamentary Constituencies 1885-1972, compiled and edited by F. W. S. Craig (Parliamentary Reference Publications 1972)
 British Parliamentary Election Results 1832-1885, compiled and edited by F. W. S. Craig (Macmillan Press 1977)
 British Parliamentary Election Results 1885-1918, compiled and edited by F. W. S. Craig (Macmillan Press 1974)
 Electoral Reform in England and Wales, by Charles Seymour (David & Charles Reprints 1970)
 The House of Commons 1754-1790, by Sir Lewis Namier and John Brooke (HMSO 1964)
 The Parliaments of England by Henry Stooks Smith (1st edition published in three volumes 1844–50), second edition edited (in one volume) by F. W. S. Craig (Political Reference Publications 1973)
 Who's Who of British Members of Parliament: Volume I 1832-1885, edited by M. Stenton (The Harvester Press 1976)
 Who's Who of British Members of Parliament, Volume II 1886-1918, edited by M. Stenton and S. Lees (Harvester Press 1978)

Politics of Newcastle upon Tyne
Parliamentary constituencies in Tyne and Wear (historic)
Parliamentary constituencies in Northumberland (historic)
Constituencies of the Parliament of the United Kingdom established in 1295
Constituencies of the Parliament of the United Kingdom disestablished in 1918